Dione Patricia Mary Venables, also known by her pen name as DG Finlay, is an English novelist and publisher who also founded The Orwell Society.

Life and work
Venables was born Dione Gordon-Finlay in Great Missenden, England in 1930, the second daughter of Alan and Florence (née Gallagher). Her early childhood was dominated by a life at St. Leonard's boarding-school from the age of three, and then twice narrowly surviving The Blitz in London. She developed a relationship with Arthur Ransome during the World War II, who encouraged her to write. Her first attempt, at age 11, featured a hedgehog called Edward Wigg, who was adapted by her cousin Jacintha Buddicom in support of the War Effort as part of the National Savings Movement. Venables wrote her own diaries, but it was not until 1962 that she published her first articles for magazines and local newspapers reporting on her experiences in Africa, the Middle East and Pakistan, while providing relief flights for refugees in war torn states.

In 1969, Venables began writing and presenting scripts for radio and in 1978, her first novel was published, with its sequel a year later. In the 1980s, she wrote five more novels before switching her attention to publishing.

In 2006, Venables created Finlay Publisher with the aim of promoting the life and works of the writer George Orwell. Finlay Publisher's first act was to print a new edition of Eric & Us, adding an important post-script written by Venables based on a series of previously unpublished diaries, letters and documented interviews. In August of the same year, Venables created a website called Orwell Direct, a forum for academics and enthusiasts alike to exchange views about Orwell. In 2008, the site began publishing a series of twenty articles written by scholars who had written at length about Orwell. They included Sir Bernard Crick, Gordon Bowker, DJ Taylor, Peter Davison, and Orwell's son, Richard Blair. Contributors encouraged Venables to institute a more formal collective of Orwell enthusiasts and on 27 December 2010, The Orwell Society was inaugurated by Venables at Phyllis Court. In 2015, she compiled and published Orwell's poetry, and in 2017, she published an account of her own war time experiences.

Venables has worked to preserve the memory of George Orwell through guest appearances on television and radio and through The Orwell Society.

Selected works

Novels
1978 – Once Around the Sun
1779 – The Edge of Tomorrow
1984 – Watchman
1986 – The Grey Regard
1987 – Deadly Relations
1987 – Graven Image
1989 – The Killing Glance

Biography
2006 – Postscript to Eric & Us
2015 – Compilation George Orwell - The Complete Poetry
2017 – Author Dione's War

References 

20th-century English women writers
20th-century English writers
English women novelists
Pseudonymous women writers
1930 births
Living people
People educated at St Leonards-Mayfield School
Founders of charities
People from Great Missenden
20th-century pseudonymous writers